Hamilton Dudley Coleman (May 12, 1845 in New Orleans, Louisiana – March 16, 1926 in Biloxi, Mississippi) was a businessman and politician who served one term between 1889 and 1891 in the United States House of Representatives representing Louisiana's 2nd congressional district (New Orleans).

Coleman served in the Washington Artillery in the Army of Northern Virginia during the American Civil War and was part of the Confederate Army that surrendered at Appomattox, Virginia.

He returned to New Orleans and became a manufacturer and dealer of farm equipment, and an organizer of New Orleans's first electric lighting company. He was elected as a Republican to Congress in 1888, but lost his bid for reelection in 1890 to Matthew D. Lagan, the previous holder of the seat.  Coleman was the last Republican to represent Louisiana in Congress until David C. Treen in 1973. Coleman was the last Republican to represent New Orleans in the House until Joseph Cao was elected in 2008.

Coleman also ran for governor and lieutenant governor, losing both races. From 1899 to 1905, he was the melter and refiner for the New Orleans Mint. He died in Biloxi in 1926 and is interred at Metairie Cemetery in New Orleans.

 Retrieved on 2009-04-16

1845 births
1926 deaths
Politicians from New Orleans
Businesspeople from New Orleans
Republican Party members of the United States House of Representatives from Louisiana
Confederate States Army soldiers
People of Louisiana in the American Civil War
Burials at Metairie Cemetery